Southside Academy was a public high school located in Baltimore, Maryland, United States. It was closed by Baltimore City Public Schools in 2013.

References

External links
 Southside Academy - Maryland Report Card

Public schools in Baltimore
Public high schools in Maryland
1998 establishments in Maryland
Defunct schools in Maryland